Wycliffe Sylvester Smith (born 18 December 1948)  is a Sint Maarten politician, former pastor and poet. Smith briefly served as prime minister of Sint Maarten in 2019. From 1983 to 1989 he was the lieutenant governor of Saba.

Bibliography 
1976 – A Voice from W-indward (poems)
1982 – Winds above the hills:a collection of poems from St. Maarten, Netherlands Antilles (poems)
1981 – Windward Island verse: a survey of poetry in the Dutch Windward Islands

References

See also
 List of Sint Maarten leaders of government

1948 births
Living people
Prime Ministers of Sint Maarten
Columbia University alumni
Lieutenant Governors of Saba